The 1936 State Line earthquake (also referred to as the 1936 Milton-Freewater earthquake) struck at 23:08 Pacific time on July 15, 1936. The earthquake had an estimated magnitude of 5.8 and a maximum Mercalli intensity of VII (Very strong).

Geology

Larger earthquakes like the 1936 State Line earthquake are not uncommon along the Olympic–Wallowa Lineament, a series of faults stretching from Port Angeles, Washington to the Wallowa Mountains in northeast Oregon. Another earthquake estimated near a magnitude 6 struck the Walla Walla valley in 1882. The earthquake occurred in the Touchet Ridge, a spur leading west off the Blue Mountains that is known as the Horse Heaven Hills west of the Wallula Gap. There is both the old fault along the ridge as well as a newer fault leading from the ridge into the valley.

To the north of the earthquake is the Hite Fault, which lies approximately parallel to the west slopes of the Blue Mountains in Walla Walla County. The Hite Fault is thought to be the boundary between the more stable North American craton to the east and accreted material to the west. While there is no evidence of a Quaternary earthquake event along the Hite Fault, the USGS and several Washington state agencies have run scenarios regarding a future earthquake on the fault.

There have been 66 earthquakes felt in the area since 1936. Most of these have had a magnitude below 4, though one event in November 1991 was 4.3.

Earthquake
Residents in Umapine reported being woken during the night.

Wells in Milton-Freewater saw an increase in water level and a creek near a town, which had previously run dry, began flowing immediately after the earthquake. Observers in Walla Walla noted rumbling noises immediately preceding the first shocks. About 70% of headstones at a nearby cemetery were found to have been rotated clockwise.

Two small foreshocks were recorded in the three hours before the mainshock.

Damage
Severe damage was widespread throughout Milton-Freewater and Walla Walla. In Athena, people were forced to evacuate their homes due to large cracks found within their walls. Rocks were reported to have wandered into some intersections and two freight cars were shaken off the tracks at Blue Mountain Station in Dayton.

The shaking was reported as being strongest near State Line. Very strong shaking occurred in Milton-Freewater, breaking windows and collapsing chimneys that had been built longer than ten years previous to the earthquake. Up to $3,000 ($53,000 in 2018) in damage was done to canned goods as well as $8,500 ($151,000 in 2018) in damage to school buildings. In Umapine a handful of homes were badly damaged.

Chimneys on roofs collapsed in numerous locations, as far away as Waitsburg. Pendulum clocks stopped in Umatilla and plaster was found to have been cracked in Prosser.

Aftershocks
Over 50 aftershocks were recorded intermittently until mid-November 1936. Several dozen were felt the night of the event in the immediate area, with only three of them reaching to Hermiston. These earthquakes occurred in both Washington and Oregon, owing to the close proximity of the mainshock to the state line. Aftershocks measuring IV on the Mercalli scale were recorded in August, with the ones that struck in November being measured as III.

See also
List of earthquakes in 1936
List of earthquakes in the United States

References

Further reading

External links

1936 natural disasters in the United States
1936 earthquakes
Earthquakes in Oregon
1936 in Oregon